A powered exoskeleton, also known as power armor, powered armor, powered suit, cybernetic suit, cybernetic armor, exosuit, hardsuit, exoframe or augmented mobility, is a mobile machine that is wearable over all or part of the human body, providing ergonomic structural support and powered by a system of electric motors, pneumatics, levers, hydraulics or a combination of cybernetic technologies, while allowing for sufficient limb movement with increased strength and endurance. The exoskeleton is designed to provide better mechanical load tolerance, and its control system aims to sense and synchronize with the user's intended motion and relay the signal to motors which manage the gears. The exoskeleton also protects the user's shoulder, waist, back and thigh against overload, and stabilizes movements when lifting and holding heavy items.

A powered exoskeleton differs from a passive exoskeleton, as the latter has no intrinsic actuator and relies completely on the user's own muscles for movements, adding more stress and making the user more prone to fatigue, although it does provide mechanical benefits and protection to the user. This also explains the difference of an exoskeleton to orthotics, as orthosis mainly aims to promote the progressively increased muscle work and, in the best case, regain and improve existing muscle functions. Currently, there are products that can help humans reduce their energy consumption by as much as 60 percent while carrying things.

History
The earliest-known exoskeleton-like device was an apparatus for assisting movement developed in 1890 by Russian engineer Nicholas Yagin. It used energy stored in compressed gas bags to assist in movement, although it was passive and required human power. In 1917, United States inventor Leslie C. Kelley developed what he called a pedomotor, which operated on steam power with artificial ligaments acting in parallel to the wearer's movements. This system was able to supplement human power with external power.

In the 1960s, the first true 'mobile machines' integrated with human movements began to appear. A suit called Hardiman was co-developed by General Electric and the US Armed Forces. The suit was powered by hydraulics and electricity and amplified the wearer's strength by a factor of 25, so that lifting  would feel like lifting . A feature called force feedback enabled the wearer to feel the forces and objects being manipulated.

The Hardiman had major limitations, including its  weight. It was also designed as a master-slave system: the operator was in a master suit surrounded by the exterior slave suit, which performed work in response to the operator's movements. The response time for the slave suit was slow compared to a suit constructed of a single layer, and bugs caused "violent and uncontrollable motion by the machine" when moving both legs simultaneously. Hardiman's slow walking speed of 0.76 metres per second (2.5 ft/s or just under 2 mph) further limited practical uses, and the project was not successful.

At about the same time, early active exoskeletons and humanoid robots were developed at the Mihajlo Pupin Institute in Yugoslavia by a team led by Prof. Miomir Vukobratović. Legged locomotion systems were developed first, with the goal of assisting in the rehabilitation of paraplegics. In the course of developing active exoskeletons, the Institute also developed theory to aid in the analysis and control of the human gait. Some of this work informed the development of modern high-performance humanoid robots. In 1972, an active exoskeleton for rehabilitation of paraplegics that was pneumatically powered and electronically programmed was tested at Belgrade Orthopedic Clinic.

In 1985, an engineer at Los Alamos National Laboratory (LANL) proposed an exoskeleton called Pitman, a powered suit of armor for infantrymen. The design included brain-scanning sensors in the helmet and was considered too futuristic; it was never built.

In 1986, an exoskeleton called the Lifesuit was designed by Monty Reed, a US Army Ranger who had broken his back in a parachute accident. While recovering in the hospital, he read Robert Heinlein's science fiction novel Starship Troopers, and Heinlein's description of mobile infantry power suits inspired Reed to design a supportive exoskeleton. In 2001, Reed began working full-time on the project, and in 2005 he wore the 12th prototype in the Saint Patrick's Day Dash foot race in Seattle, Washington. The Lifesuit prototype 14 can walk  on a full charge and lift  for the wearer.

Classification

The general categorization suggests several feasible exoskeleton categories. Such categories have general classes, due to the wide quantity of exoskeletons in existence, and are the structure, the body part focused on, the action, the power technology, the purpose, and the application area varying from one to another.

Exoskeletons are not only designed for specific body parts; the exoskeletons may be designed more generally for only one hand, a leg, or even the complete body. Thus, the separation of the classes demonstrates the most common body parts exoskeletons can be built for. The full-body class refers to the exoskeletons made to assist all the limbs, or most of the body. The upper body refers to the exoskeletons made for the upper limbs, and involving the chest, head, back, and/or shoulders. The lower body category refers to the exoskeletons made for the lower limbs: thighs, lower legs, and/or hips. Moreover, there are classes for specific limbs and specific joints. These classes include exoskeletons designed for the knee, ankle, hand, arm, foot, etc. Additionally, there is a special class for any other exoskeleton that is not included in the previous classes.

Rigid exoskeletons are those whose structural components attached to the user’s body are made with hard materials. Such materials include metals, plastics, fibers, etc. On the other hand, soft exoskeletons, also called exo-suits, are made with materials that allow free movement of the structural components. Exo-suits are often made with, yet not restricted to, textiles.

The action category describes the type of help the exoskeleton gives the user, dividing exoskeletons into active and passive action. The active class comprises exoskeletons that give “active” aid to the user; in other words, these exoskeletons perform the movements without the need for the user to apply energy. The energy needed to perform the movement is supplied by an external source. On the other hand, the passive class comprises exoskeletons that need the user to perform the movement to work; these exoskeletons do not have power sources. Thus, the user has to perform the movement, and while doing it, the exoskeleton facilitates the movement.

The powered technologies are separated into four main classes, with one specific class for hybrid and one for any other non-common power technology. The four main classes comprise the electric, hydraulic, and pneumatic actuators as the active action, and the mechanical systems as the passive action.

The exoskeleton’s purpose defines what the exoskeleton will be used for. This category has only two classes: recovery and performance. The recovery exoskeletons are used for rehabilitation; the performance exoskeletons are used for assistance.

The last category comprises the application area for which the exoskeleton was made. Each exoskeleton may belong to one or more class. The military class comprises any exoskeleton used for any activity involving an army, navy, airforce, or any other military branch. The medical class comprises the exoskeletons involved in clinical activities, or in general, used in any hospital/clinic. Additionally, the recovery exoskeletons are normally classified in the medical class. Furthermore, the research class comprises the exoskeletons that are nowadays in their research development phase. The industrial class, as its name suggests, encompasses those exoskeletons made specifically for industrial activities. These exoskeletons are characterized for being used by people without any pathology seeking the avoidance of long-term physical damages. This description also applies to military exoskeletons. The civilian class is for the recovery or performance exoskeletons made for people to use in their homes or public spaces, aiding in tasks that people cannot perform as easily alone. Finally, there is a class for exoskeletons in which the applications do not fit into any of the previous classes.

Applications

Medical
In medical application, e.g. with complete paraplegia after spinal cord injury, an exoskeleton can be an additional option for the supply of aids if the structural and functional properties of the neuromuscular and skeletal system are too limited to be able to achieve mobilization with an orthosis. In patients with complete paraplegia (ASIA A), exoskeletons are interesting as an alternative to an orthosis under this criterion for lesion heights above the thoracic vertebra (T12). In patients with incomplete paraplegia (ASIA B-D), orthotics are even suitable for lesion heights above T12 in order to promote the patient's own activity to such an extent that the therapeutical mobilization can be successful. In contrast to an orthosis, an exoskeleton takes over a large part of the active muscle work, while an orthosis is intended to activate the recovery of muscle work. In addition powered exoskeletons can improve the quality of life of individuals who have lost the use of their legs by enabling system-assisted walking. Exoskeletons—that may be called "step rehabilitation robots"—may also help with the rehabilitation from stroke, spinal cord injury or during aging. Several prototype exoskeletons are under development. The Ekso GT, made by Ekso Bionics, is the first exoskeleton to be approved by the US Food and Drug Administration (FDA) for stroke patients. The German Research Centre for Artificial Intelligence has developed two general purpose powered exoskeletons, CAPIO and VI-Bot. These are primarily being used for teleoperation. Exoskeleton technology is also being developed to enhance precision during surgery, and to help nurses move and carry heavy patients.

Military

Developing a full-body suit that meets the needs of soldiers has proven challenging. The Defense Advanced Research Projects Agency (DARPA) launched the Warrior Web program in September 2011 and has developed and funded several prototypes, including a "soft exosuit" developed by Harvard University's Wyss Institute. In the early 2000s, DARPA funded the first Sarcos full-body, powered exoskeleton prototype, which was hydraulically actuated and consumed 6,800 watts of power. By 2010, DARPA and Sarcos had more than halved that, to 3,000 watts, but still required the exoskeleton to be tethered to the power source. Nowadays, the Sarcos Guardian XO is powered by lithium ion batteries and is applicable for military logistics applications. In 2019, the US Army's TALOS exoskeleton project was put on hold. A variety of "slimmed-down" exoskeletons have been developed for use on the battlefield, aimed at decreasing fatigue and increasing productivity. For example, Lockheed Martin's ONYX suit aims to support soldiers in performing tasks that are "knee-intensive", such as crossing difficult terrain. Leia Stirling's group has identified that exoskeletons can reduce a soldier's response times.

Civilian
Exoskeletons are being developed to help firefighters and other rescue workers to climb stairs while carrying heavy equipment.

Industry
Passive exoskeleton technology is increasingly being used in the automotive industry, with the goal of reducing worker injury (especially in the shoulders and spine) and reducing errors due to fatigue. They are also being examined for use in logistics.

These systems can be divided into two categories:

 exoskeletons for upper-limb for assisting shoulder flexion-extension movements;
 exoskeletons for lumbar support for assisting manual lifting tasks.

For broadest application, industrial exoskeletons must be lightweight, comfortable, safe, and minimally disruptive to the environment. For some applications, single-joint exoskeletons (i.e. intended to assist only the limb involved in specific tasks) are more appropriate than full-body powered suits. Full-body powered exoskeletons have been developed to assist with heavy loads in the industrial setting, and for specialized applications such as nuclear power plant maintenance.

The biomechanical efficacy of exoskeletons in industrial applications is however still largely unknown. Companies have to conduct a risk assessment for workplaces at which exoskeletons are to be used. The Institute for Occupational Safety and Health of the German Social Accident Insurance has developed a draft risk assessment for exoskeletons and their use. The safety assessment is based on diverse experience including machine safety, personal protective equipment and risk analysis of physical stresses at work. The exoskeletons available on the market often fail to give adequate consideration to safety aspects, in some cases despite claims to the contrary by their manufacturers.

Products
Japet Exoskeleton is a powered lower-back exoskeleton for work and industry based on established passive braces. It is intended to reduce lumbar pressure.
Parker Hannifin's Indego Exoskeleton is an FDA-Cleared, electrically powered support system for legs that helps spinal cord injury patients and stroke patients walk.
 ReWalk features powered hip and knee motion to enable those with lower limb disabilities, including paraplegia as a result of spinal cord injury (SCI), to perform self-initiated standing, walking, and stair ascending and descending. ReStore, a simpler system by the same manufacturer, attaches to a single leg to assist with gait retraining, and was approved by the FDA in 2019.
 Ekso Bionics's EskoGT is a hydraulically powered exoskeleton system allowing paraplegics to stand and walk with crutches or a walker. It was approved by the FDA in 2019.
 Cyberdyne's HAL is a wearable robot that comes in multiple configurations. HAL is currently in use in Japanese and US hospitals and was given global safety certification in 2013.
 Honda's Walking Assist Device is a partial exoskeleton to help those with difficulties walking unsupported. It was given pre-market notification by the FDA in 2019.
 The European Space Agency has developed a series of ergonomic exoskeletons for robotic teleoperation, including the EXARM, X-Arm-2 and SAM exoskeletons. The target application is telemanipulation of astronaut-like robots, operating in a remote harsh environment.
In 2018, Spanish exoskeleton provider Gogoa Mobility was the first European company to get a CE approval for their powered lower body HANK exoskeleton for medical use. The CE approval covered the use of HANK for rehabilitation due to Spinal Cord Injury (SCI), Acquired Brain Damage (ABD) & Neurodegenerative Illnesses. In Feb 2020, their knee specific exoskeleton called Belk also received a CE approval.  
Roam Robotics produces a soft exoskeleton for skiers and snowboarders.
Wandercraft produces Atalante, the first powered exoskeleton to allow users to walk hands-free, unlike most powered medical exoskeleton that require the simultaneous use of crutches.
Their "Alpha" version was demonstrated at the 2020 Consumer Electronics Show with Delta Air Lines.
ExoMed's ExoHeaver is electrically powered exoskeleton, designed for Russian nickel and palladium mining and smelting company in 2018. Designed for lifting and holding loads weighing up to 60 kg and collecting information about the environment using sensors. More than 20 exoskeletons have been tested and are used at the enterprise.
Comau introduced a passive spring-loaded exoskeleton called the Comau MATE which provides antigravitational support to the user. The exosuit supports the upper arms and spine to help facilitate work and reduce physical fatigue. MATE’s spring-loaded actuation box stores energy through an advanced mechanism during the extension phase, and then returns it to the user during the flexion phase.

Projects on hold/abandoned
 Lockheed Martin's Human Universal Load Carrier (HULC) was abandoned after tests showed that wearing the suit caused users to expend significantly more energy during controlled treadmill walks.
 The Berkeley Lower Extremity Exoskeleton (BLEEX) consisted of mechanical metal leg braces, a power unit, and a backpack-like frame to carry a heavy load. The technology developed for BLEEX led to SuitX's Phoenix.
A project from Ghent University, WALL-X was shown in 2013 to reduce the metabolic cost of normal walking. This result was achieved by optimizing the controls based on the study of the biomechanics of the human-exoskeleton interaction.

Limitations and design issues
Mobility aids are frequently abandoned for lack of usability. Major measures of usability include whether the device reduces the energy consumed during motion, and whether it is safe to use. Some design issues faced by engineers are listed below.

Power supply
One of the biggest problems facing engineers and designers of powered exoskeletons is the power supply. This is a particular issue if the exoskeleton is intended to be worn "in the field", i.e. outside a context in which the exoskeleton can be tethered to external power sources via power cables, thus having to rely solely on onboard power supply. Battery packs would require frequent replacement or recharging, and may risk explosion due to thermal runaway. According to Sarcos, the company has solved some of these issues related to battery technology, particularly consumption, reducing the amount of power required to operate its Guardian XO to under  and enabling its batteries to be “hot-swapped” without powering down the unit. Internal combustion engine offer high energy output, but problems include exhaust fumes, waste heat and inability to modulate power smoothly, as well as the periodic need to replenish volatile fuels. Hydrogen cells have been used in some prototypes but also suffer from several safety problems.

Skeleton
Early exoskeletons used inexpensive and easy-to-mold materials such as steel and aluminium alloy. However, steel is heavy and the powered exoskeleton must work harder to overcome its own weight, reducing efficiency. Aluminium alloys are lightweight, but fail through fatigue quickly. Fiberglass, carbon fiber and carbon nanotubes have considerably higher strength per weight. "Soft" exoskeletons that attach motors and control devices to flexible clothing are also under development.

Actuators

Joint actuators also face the challenge of being lightweight, yet powerful. Technologies used include pneumatic activators, hydraulic cylinders, and electronic servomotors. Elastic actuators are being investigated to simulate control of stiffness in human limbs and provide touch perception. The air muscle,  braided pneumatic actuator or McKibben air muscle, is also used to enhance tactile feedback.

Joint flexibility
The flexibility of human anatomy is a design issue for traditional "hard" robots. Several human joints such as the hips and shoulders are ball and socket joints, with the center of rotation inside the body. Since no two individuals are exactly alike, fully mimicking the degrees of freedom of a joint movement is not possible. Instead, the exoskeleton joint is commonly modeled as a series of hinges with one degree of freedom for each axis of rotations.

Spinal flexibility is another challenge since the spine is effectively a stack of limited-motion ball joints. There is no simple combination of external single-axis hinges that can easily match the full range of motion of the human spine. Because accurate alignment is challenging, devices often include the ability to compensate for misalignment with additional degrees of freedom.

Soft exoskeletons bend with the body and address some of these issues.

Power control and modulation
A successful exoskeleton should assist its user, for example by reducing the energy required to perform a task. Individual variations in the nature, range and force of movements make it difficult for a standardized device to provide the appropriate amount of assistance at the right time. Algorithms to tune control parameters to automatically optimize the energy cost of walking are under development. Direct feedback between the human nervous system and motorized prosthetics ("neuro-embodied design") has also been implemented in a few high-profile cases.

Adaptation to user size variations
Humans exhibit a wide range of physical size differences in both skeletal lengths and limb and torso girth, so exoskeletons must either be adaptable or fitted to individual users. In military applications, it may be possible to address this by requiring the user to be of an approved physical size in order to be issued an exoskeleton. Physical body size restrictions already occur in the military for jobs such as aircraft pilots, due to the problems of fitting seats and controls to very large and very small people. For soft exoskeletons, this is less of a problem.

Health and safety
While exoskeletons can reduce the stress of manual labor, they may also pose dangers. The US Centers for Disease Control and Prevention (CDC) has called for research to address the potential dangers and benefits of the technology, noting potential new risk factors for workers such as lack of mobility to avoid a falling object, and potential falls due to a shift in center of gravity.

As of 2018, the US Occupational Safety and Health Administration was not preparing any safety standards for exoskeletons. The International Organization for Standardization published a safety standard in 2014, and ASTM International was working on standards to be released beginning in 2019.

Major events
 Cybathlon: an international competition in which people with physical disabilities compete against each other to complete everyday tasks using state-of-the-art technical assistance systems.

Fictional depictions

Powered exoskeletons are featured in science fiction books and media as the standard equipment for space marines, miners, astronauts and colonists. The science fiction novel Starship Troopers by Robert A. Heinlein (1959) is credited with introducing the concept of futuristic military armor. Other examples include Tony Stark's Iron Man suit, the robot exoskeleton used by Ellen Ripley to fight the Xenomorph queen in Aliens and the Power Armor used in the Fallout video game franchise.

See also
 Back brace: somewhat similar devices as passive exoskeletons
 Bionics
 Future Force Warrior
 List of emerging technologies
 Mecha
 Walking truck, also known as the "cybernetic anthropomorphous machine"

References

External links

 Video, images and articles about the Bleex exoskeleton project
 University of California Los Angeles (UCLA)—Exo Arm Project
 Wired Issue 13.01, January 2005—Ironmen, the world's first exoskeleton weight-lifting competition
 Video and abstract about the GAIT Robotic Orthosis (via IEEE Xplore)
 SARCOS Military Humanoid Exoskeleton (YouTube)

1890 introductions
Body armor
Emerging technologies
Industrial robotics
Medical robotics
Military robotics
Prosthetics
Robotic exoskeletons
Russian inventions